Carlos Salazar may refer to:


Arts and entertainment
 Carlos Salazar Herrera (1906–1980), Costa Rican writer
 Carlos Salazar (actor) (1930–2022), Filipino actor

Politicians
 Carlos Salazar Castro (1800–1867), chief of state of El Salvador and Guatemala
 Carlos Salazar (Argentine politician), senator for Tucumán Province from 2007 to 2009

Sportspeople
 Carlos Salazar (Venezuelan footballer) (born 1989)
 Carlos Gabriel Salazar (born 1964), Argentine boxer
 Carlos Salazar (Colombian footballer) (born 1981)

Other
 Carlos Salazar Lomelín (born 1951), Mexican businessman
 Carlos Enrique Salazar, Guatemalan chess master